Sean Morgan Denison (born August 26, 1985) is a Canadian professional basketball player. He ended up in seventh place with the Canada national men's basketball team at the 2007 Pan American Games in Rio de Janeiro, Brazil. A physics student at the Santa Clara University he played with the national development team at the 2004 Tournament of the Americas where Canada finished fourth.

External links
PKL profile
Santa Clara profile
Canadian Olympic Committee

1985 births
Living people
Basketball people from British Columbia
Basketball players at the 2007 Pan American Games
BC Spartak Primorye players
Canadian expatriate basketball people in the United States
Canadian men's basketball players
Eisbären Bremerhaven players
Pan American Games competitors for Canada
People from Trail, British Columbia
Power forwards (basketball)
Santa Clara Broncos men's basketball players